The following is a list of the 13 cantons of the Rhône department, in France, following the French canton reorganisation which came into effect in March 2015:

Anse
L'Arbresle
Belleville-en-Beaujolais
Brignais
Genas
Gleizé
Mornant
Saint-Symphorien-d'Ozon
Tarare 
Thizy-les-Bourgs
Val d'Oingt
Vaugneray
Villefranche-sur-Saône

References